Kauksi (German Kauks) is a small village in Alutaguse Parish, Ida-Viru County in northeastern Estonia. Kauksi has 59 inhabitants (as of 1 January 2006). It lies on the northern side of Estonia's largest lake, Peipus (Peipsi järv).

Kauksi was first named in 1543 in an old historical document. In 1732 the town belonged to the goods company Maidla. In the 18th century a separate goods company was established between ved Peipus and Kauksi. It was owned by the Russian nobleman Michailo Rudneff. The estate had its own port with a ferry connection to Tartu.

Kauksi is a favourite tourist destination in the summer. It is located one km from the road between Tartu and Jõhvi. From here, a sandy beach runs almost unbroken along the Peipus' shores until Vasknarva. Air and water temperatures are on average higher than at any other Estonian resort. In 1961 a tourist centre opened in Kauksi.

References

External links
Detailed description 
Tourism in Kauksi 

Villages in Ida-Viru County